The FIBA Oceania Championship for Men 1995 was the qualifying tournament of FIBA Oceania for the 1996 Summer Olympics in Atlanta. The tournament was held in Sydney.  won its 12th Oceania Championship to qualify for the Olympics.

Teams that did not enter

Results

Championship

Final standings

Australia qualified for the 1996 Summer Olympics.

References
FIBA Archive

FIBA Oceania Championship
Championship
1995 in New Zealand basketball
1995 in Australian basketball
International basketball competitions hosted by Australia
Australia men's national basketball team games
New Zealand men's national basketball team games
Basketball in New South Wales